Gandikota Rahasyam ( Secret of Gandikota) is a 1969 Telugu-language film co-written and directed by B. Vittalacharya. It stars N. T. Rama Rao, Jayalalitha with music composed by T. V. Raju. The film was produced by D. V. S. Raju under the DVS Productions banner. The film was dubbed in Hindi as Baghavat. It is remake of Tamil movie Nadodi Mannan (1958).

Plot
Once upon on time, there was a kingdom Gandikota, its prince Jayanth (N. T. Rama Rao) spends life with frolic and his cousin Pratapa Simha (Rajanala) who wants to grab the kingdom habituates him to all sorts of vices. Rajamata Hymavathi Devi (Hemalatha) senses it and decides to conduct the crowning ceremony of Jayanth. At that point in time, Pratap ploys and provokes the public against Jayanth, by charging additional taxes which was refused by a village youth Raja (again N. T. Rama Rao), who resembles Jayanth, so, Pratap declares him as a rebel. Here Raja moves with his lover Radha (Jayalalitha) and a friend Vajralu (Rajababu) when soldiers attack them and Raja & Radha get separated. After a strive, Raja reaches the fort where Jayanth is surprised to see him when he makes Jayanth realize the facts and understand their pain. At that Moment, Jayanth promises with tears that he will stand for the welfare of his people. After that, they become good friends, Jayanth invites Raja for the ceremony, when Pratap poisons Jayanth and Mahamantri (Mikkilineni) arranges treatment secretly. Now it is a critical situation, if Jayanth could not reach the function till sunrise, the kingdom was captured by Pratap. So, Mahamantri requests Raja to act as Jayanth, he accepts and performs the crowning. There onwards, he makes a lot of alterations in the constitution for the welfare of the public. But Raja's situation becomes delicate, to protect the chastity of Jayanth's wife Lalitha Devi (Devika). After some time, Pratap suspects the change of attitude & behaviour of Raja, finds the whereabouts of Jayanth and shifts him to a mysterious place. Thereafter, he puts a blame on Raja as the murderer of Jayanth and arrests him. But he escapes, rescues Jayanth and stamps out Pratap. Finally, Jayanth appreciates Raja's loyalty and asks him to stay along with him as his Chief Commander.

Cast
N. T. Rama Rao as Raja & Jayanth (dual role)
Jayalalitha as Radha 
Rajanala as Pratapa Rudrudu
Mikkilineni as Maha Mantri
Raja Babu as Vajralu
Allu Ramalingaiah as Avadhani 
Prabhakar Reddy as Dalapathi 
Dr. Sivaramakraishnaiah
Tyagaraju as Bhusaiah 
Raavi Kondala Rao as Kanakaiah 
Sarathi as Timmaiah
Jagga Rao
Devika as Lalitha Devi 
Hemalatha as Raja Maata Hymavathi Devi 
Rama Prabha as Subbulu 
T. G. Kamala Devi as complainant in the king's court
Nalla Ramamurthy

Soundtrack

Music composed by T. V. Raju.

References

External links
 

1969 films
1960s Telugu-language films
Films based on Indian folklore
Films scored by T. V. Raju